Andrei Heorhievich Kazak (born 13 March 1980) is a Belarusian sport shooter. Kazak made his official debut for the 2004 Summer Olympics in Athens, where he competed in the men's 10 m running target, a shooting event which has since been removed from the Olympic events. Kazak shot 292 targets in the slow-run and 283 in the fast-run for a total score of 575 points, finishing only in ninth place.

Eight years after competing in his last Olympics, Kazak qualified for his second Belarusian team, as a 32-year-old, at the 2012 Summer Olympics in London, by placing ninth in the free pistol from the sixth meet of the 2011 ISSF World Cup series in Munich, Germany. Kazak scored a total of 547 targets in the qualifying rounds of the men's 50 m pistol, by two inner tens behind his teammate Kanstantsin Lukashyk, finishing in thirty-first place.

References

External links
NBC Olympics Profile

1980 births
Living people
Belarusian male sport shooters
Olympic shooters of Belarus
Shooters at the 2004 Summer Olympics
Shooters at the 2012 Summer Olympics
Sportspeople from Grodno